The 2009 Volvo World Match Play Championship was the 45th Volvo World Match Play Championship played, the first for two years and the first time at Finca Cortesín Golf Club. It was held from 29 October to 1 November, with the champion receiving €750,000. A new format was introduced, with the sixteen players split into four groups of four, with the winner of each group progressing to the semi-finals. Once again it was an official money event on the European Tour.

Qualification
1. Defending champion (Ernie Els is not taking part):
Rory McIlroy

2. Winner of the 2009 Volvo China Open
Scott Strange

3. The leading player, based upon their nationality, listed on the Official World Golf Ranking, from each of the following regions:
 Europe - Paul Casey
 Africa/Middle East - Retief Goosen
 North America - Anthony Kim
 South America - Camilo Villegas
 Asia - Jeev Milkha Singh
 Australasia - Robert Allenby

4. The leading four players (not otherwise qualified) from the Official World Golf Rankings
Henrik Stenson
Sergio García
Lee Westwood
Martin Kaymer

5. The leading four players (not otherwise qualified) from the Race to Dubai
Ross Fisher
Ángel Cabrera
Simon Dyson
Oliver Wilson

Substitutions were made from various sources.

Course

Format
The sixteen players were split into four groups of four, seeded by their World Ranking. Within each group, every player played each other in a round robin format over full 18-hole matches. Each match completed the full 18 holes. Points were awarded based upon win (2), tie (1) or loss (0). The leading player from each group qualified for the semi-final knockout stage. In case of ties, aggregate number of holes won were used to determine the winner.

The semi-finals and finals were played over 36 holes.

Group stages

Results

Standings

Final four

Prize money breakdown

References

External links
Official site
Coverage on the European Tour's official site

Volvo World Match Play Championship
Volvo World Match Play Championship
Volvo World Match Play Championship
Golf tournaments in Spain
October 2009 sports events in Europe
November 2009 sports events in Europe